Otholobium piliferum is a small, softly hairy shrublet of up to  high that has been assigned to the Pea family, with branches horizontal at the base with rising tips. It regrows from the underground rootstock after fire destroys the vegetation. It has clover-like leaves on short stalks and white, pea-like flowers flushed with mauve that grow in triplets in the axils of the upper leaves of the new shoots. The species is only known from near Makhanda, Eastern Cape province of South Africa. Flowers have been seen in September and January. This is a very rare species about which little is known and which is likely threatened with extinction.

Description 
Otholobium piliferum is a small shrub, with branches that are horizontal at the base and rise at the tips. It regrows from its rootstock after fire destroys the above ground vegetation. Initially, the upright leaflets are somewhat hairy but these hairs are quickly shed. The leaflets are also adorned with sunken glands that are less obvious on the lower surface. On the lower surface, the veins are conspicuous. The tip of the leaflets is pointy with the middle vein extending from the leaf blade into a straight hair-thin point, while the base is wedge-shaped. The leaflets are unequal in size and shape. The leaflets to the side are smaller and asymmetrical with the outer margin curved and the inner margin almost straight.

Each individual flower is subtended by a 3 mm long, hood-shaped, narrowly lance-shaped bract. As in most Faboideae, the corolla is zygomorphic, forms a specialized structure and consists of five free petals. The corolla is white flushed with mauve. The blade of the wing is adorned with up to 10 ridges and has one lobe or auricle facing the base. The fruits and seeds have not been described so far.

Likeness to other species 
Otholobium piliferum is strongly reminiscent of O. bolusii, which is also about 30 cm high, has leaves consisting of 3 unequal leaflets, those at the sides asymmetrical, and stipules that are silky or fringed with hairs, but this species has a distribution far to the west.

Taxonomy 
As far as known, this species was collected by Thomas Robertson Sim in 1892, and again in 1914 by Bulcock, but has not been found since. Charles Stirton and A. Muthama Muasya considered it sufficiently different from its relatives, described it in 2017, and called it Otholobium piliferum. The name of the genus Otholobium is a combination of the Greek words  meaning to push and  meaning pod, which Stirton selected because its fruit seems to be pushed out of the calyx.

Distribution and ecology 
Otholobium piliferum grows on the eastern margin of the typical fynbos biome, in patches of Bhisho Thornveld and Suurberg Shale Fynbos. Its distribution is disjunct from that of all other species in this genus.

References 

Otholobium piliferum
Endemic flora of South Africa
Plants described in 2017